The name Ben Trovato derives from Giordano Bruno's aphorism "se non è vero, è molto ben trovato". It may refer to

 A pseudonym of Samuel Lover
 A poem by Edwin Arlington Robinson
 Two of the homes of American author Byrd Spilman Dewey

See also 
 Bentrovata, a genus of flies
 Trovato (disambiguation)